Hyloscirtus armatus is a species of frog in the family Hylidae found in Bolivia and Peru. It has been observed between 1700 and 2400 meters above sea level.
Its natural habitats are subtropical or tropical moist montane forests and rivers.
It is threatened by habitat loss. Most likely, this is a species complex, composed of several species.

References

Hyloscirtus
Amphibians of Bolivia
Amphibians of Peru
Amphibians described in 1902
Taxonomy articles created by Polbot